Goddess is a 2013 Australian romantic comedy musical film, directed by Mark Lamprell. The film stars singer Ronan Keating, Laura Michelle Kelly and Magda Szubanski.

Plot
Elspeth Dickens (Laura Michelle Kelly) dreams of finding her "voice" despite being stuck in an isolated farmhouse with her twin boys (Phoenix and Levi Morrison). A webcam she installs in her kitchen becomes her pathway to fame and fortune, making her a cyber-sensation. Through singing her funny sink-songs into the webcam, Elspeth becomes a cyber-sensation.

While her husband James (Ronan Keating) is off saving the world's whales, Elspeth is offered the chance of a lifetime. But when forced to choose between fame and family, the newly anointed internet goddess almost loses it all.

Cast

Ronan Keating as James Dickens
Laura Michelle Kelly as Elspeth Dickens
Magda Szubanski as Cassandra Wolfe
Phoenix Morrison as Fred (twin)
Levi Morrison as Zac (twin)
Dustin Clare as Rory
Hugo Johnstone-Burt as Ralph
Corinne Grant as Fizz
Pia Miranda as Sophie
Natalie Tran as Helen
Lucy Durack as Cherry
Celia Ireland as Mary
Cameron Lyon as Neil
Paul Livingston as Waiter
Viviana Delgado as Peruvian Woman

Production
Goddess was filmed, in part, in Sydney, Australia and Stanley, Tasmania. The film is based on the original stage play Sinksongs, written and performed by Joanna Weinberg with music for the film written by Joanna Weinberg, Bryony Marks and Judy Morris.

Film festivals
In early June 2014, Goddess opened the Maui International Film Festival to great reviews

Box office
In its opening weekend, Goddess grossed $512,445 in Australia. The film was shown on 207 screens, which gave it a per-screen average of $2,476.

Accolades

External links

References

2013 films
2013 romantic comedy films
Australian romantic comedy films
Australian musical comedy films
2010s English-language films
Films set in Australia
Films shot in Sydney
2010s musical comedy films
Films directed by Mark Lamprell
Screen Australia films
Roadshow Entertainment films